The Red Head (French: Poil de carotte) is a 1932 French drama film directed by Julien Duvivier and starring Harry Baur, Robert Lynen and Louis Gauthier. It is a remake of Duvivier's 1925 silent film The Red Head.

The film's art direction was by Lucien Aguettand and Lucien Carré.

Cast
 Harry Baur as Monsieur Lepic  
 Robert Lynen as François Lepic, dit 'Poil de Carotte'  
 Louis Gauthier as Le parrain  
 Simone Aubry as Ernestine Lepic  
 Maxime Fromiot as Félix Lepic  
 Colette Segall as La petite Mathilde  
 Marthe Marty as Honorine, la vieille bonne  
 Christiane Dor as Annette, la bonne  
 Catherine Fonteney as Madame Lepic 
 Claude Borelli as Un petit garçon à la noce 
 Colette Borelli as Une petite fille à la noce  
 Jean Borelli as Un petit garçon à la noce

References

Bibliography 
 Crisp, Colin. French Cinema—A Critical Filmography: Volume 1, 1929–1939. Indiana University Press, 2015.

External links 
 

1932 films
French drama films
1932 drama films
1930s French-language films
Films directed by Julien Duvivier
Films based on French novels
Remakes of French films
Sound film remakes of silent films
French black-and-white films
1930s French films